The following is a list of managers of Yokohama F. Marinos and their major honours from the beginning of the club's official managerial records in 1993 to the present day. As of the start of the 2011 season, Yokohama F. Marinos have had 15 full-time managers.

Managers
As of 8 May 2022. Statistics include competitive matches only. Caretakers are shown in italics.

Managers
 
Yokohama F. Marinos